Frijoles charros (cowboy beans) is a traditional Mexican dish. It is named after the traditional Mexican  cowboy horsemen, or charros. The dish is characterized by pinto beans stewed with onion, garlic, and bacon. Other common ingredients include chili peppers, tomatoes, cilantro, ham, sausage, pork and chorizo. It is served warm, and is usually of a soupy consistency.

See also
Borracho beans
Cowboy beans, a similar US dish. "Cowboy beans are usually made with onions, garlic, tomatoes, salted pork, chillies and beans.

References

External links
Frijoles Charros Recipe [English]

Mexican cuisine
Legume dishes